Seppo Suoraniemi (born August 26, 1951 in Oulu, Finland) is a retired professional ice hockey player who played in the SM-liiga.  He played for HJK, Jokerit, Ilves, and TPS.  He was inducted into the Finnish Hockey Hall of Fame in 1992.

External links
 Finnish Hockey Hall of Fame bio

1951 births
Sportspeople from Oulu
Jokerit players
Ilves players
HC TPS players
Living people
Ice hockey players at the 1980 Winter Olympics
Olympic ice hockey players of Finland